In decision theory, the odds algorithm (or Bruss algorithm) is a mathematical method for computing optimal strategies for a class of problems that belong to the domain of optimal stopping problems.  Their solution follows from the odds strategy, and the importance of the odds strategy lies in its optimality, as explained below. 

The odds algorithm applies to a class of problems called  last-success problems.  Formally, the objective in these problems is to maximize the probability of identifying in a sequence of sequentially observed independent events the last event satisfying a specific criterion (a "specific event").  This identification must be done at the time of observation.  No revisiting of preceding observations is permitted.  Usually, a specific event is defined by the decision maker as an event that is of true interest in the view of "stopping" to take a well-defined action. Such problems are encountered  in several situations.

Examples
Two different situations exemplify the interest in maximizing the probability to stop on a last specific event.
 
 Suppose a car is advertised for sale to the highest bidder (best "offer"). Let n potential buyers respond and ask to see the car. Each insists upon an immediate decision from the seller to accept the bid, or not. Define a bid as interesting, and coded 1 if it is better than all preceding bids, and coded 0 otherwise. The bids will form a random sequence of 0s and 1s. Only 1s interest the seller, who may fear that each successive 1 might be the last. It follows from the definition that the very last 1 is the highest bid. Maximizing the probability of selling on the last 1 therefore means maximizing the probability of selling best.
 A physician, using a special treatment, may use the code 1 for a successful treatment, 0 otherwise. The physician treats a sequence of n patients the same way, and wants to minimize any suffering, and to treat every responsive patient in the sequence. Stopping on the last 1 in such a random sequence of 0s and 1s would achieve this objective.  Since the physician is no prophet, the objective is to maximize the probability of stopping on the last 1. (See Compassionate use.)

Definitions 
Consider a sequence of  independent events. Associate with this sequence another sequence of independent events   with values 1 or 0.   Here  , called a success,  stands for
These random variables  are observed sequentially and the goal is to correctly select the last success when it is observed.  

Let  be the probability that the kth event is interesting. Further let
Note that  represents the odds of the kth event turning out to be interesting, explaining the name of the odds algorithm.

Algorithmic procedure

The odds algorithm sums up the odds in reverse order

until this sum reaches or exceeds the value 1 for the first time. If this happens at index s, it saves s and the corresponding sum

If the sum of the odds  does not reach 1, it sets s = 1.  At the same time it computes

The output is

 , the stopping threshold
 , the win probability.

Odds strategy
The odds strategy is the rule to observe the events one after the other and to stop on the first interesting event from index s onwards (if any), where s is the stopping threshold of output a.

The importance of the odds strategy, and hence of the odds algorithm, lies in the following odds theorem.

Odds theorem 
The odds theorem states that

 The odds strategy is optimal, that is, it maximizes the probability of stopping on the last 1.
 The win probability of the odds strategy equals   
 If , the win probability  is always at least , and this lower bound is best possible.

Features
The odds algorithm computes the optimal strategy and the optimal win probability at the same time. Also, the number of operations of the odds algorithm is (sub)linear in n. Hence no quicker algorithm can possibly
exist for all sequences, so that the odds algorithm is, at the same time, optimal as an algorithm.

Sources
 devised the odds algorithm, and coined its name. It is also known as Bruss algorithm (strategy). Free implementations can be found on the web.

Applications
Applications reach from medical questions in clinical trials over sales problems, secretary problems, portfolio selection, (one way) search strategies, trajectory problems and the parking problem to problems in online maintenance and others.

There exists, in the same spirit, an Odds Theorem for continuous-time arrival processes with independent increments such as the Poisson process. In some cases, the odds are not necessarily known in advance (as in Example 2 above) so that the application of the odds algorithm is not directly possible. In this case each step can use sequential estimates of the odds. This is meaningful, if the number of unknown parameters is not large compared with the number n of observations. The question of optimality is then more complicated, however, and requires additional studies.  Generalizations of the odds algorithm allow for different rewards for failing to stop
and wrong stops as well as replacing independence assumptions by weaker ones (Ferguson (2008)).

Variations 
 discussed a problem of selecting the last  successes. 

 proved a multiplicative odds theorem which deals with a problem of stopping at any of the last  successes.

 discussed a problem of selecting  out of the last  successes and obtained a tight lower bound of win probability. When   the problem is equivalent to Bruss' odds problem.

Multiple choice problem 
A player is allowed  choices, and he wins if any choice is the last success.
For classical secretary problem,  discussed the cases .
For further cases of odds problem, see .

An optimal strategy belongs to the class of strategies defined by a set of threshold numbers , where . The first choice is to be used on the first candidates starting with th applicant, and once the first choice is used, second choice is to be used on the first candidate starting with th applicant, and so on.

When ,  showed that the tight lower bound of win probability is equal to  
For general positive integer ,  discussed the tight lower bound of win probability.
For further cases that , see .

See also 
 Odds
 Clinical trial
 Expanded access
 Secretary problem

References 

 
 —: "A note on Bounds for the Odds Theorem of Optimal Stopping", Annals of Probability Vol. 31,  1859–1862,   (2003).
 —: "The art of a right decision", Newsletter of the European Mathematical Society, Issue 62, 14–20,  (2005).
T. S. Ferguson: (2008, unpublished)
  

 
 Shoo-Ren Hsiao and Jiing-Ru. Yang: "Selecting the Last Success in Markov-Dependent Trials", Journal of Applied Probability, Vol. 93,  271–281, (2002).
  
 Mitsushi Tamaki: "Optimal Stopping on Trajectories and the Ballot Problem", Journal of Applied Probability Vol.  38, 946–959 (2001).
 E. Thomas, E. Levrat, B. Iung: "L'algorithme de Bruss comme contribution à une maintenance préventive", Sciences et Technologies de l'automation, Vol. 4, 13-18 (2007).

External links
 Bruss Algorithmus http://www.p-roesler.de/odds.html

Optimization algorithms and methods
Statistical algorithms
Optimal decisions